Henry Forrester may refer to:

Henry Forrester, fictional character in List of Hollyoaks characters (2013)
Sir Henry Forrester, fictional character in Stanley and Livingstone

See also
Harry Forrester (disambiguation)